Jean-François Losciuto is a Belgian football coach who presently manages Richards Bay of the South African National First Division as of 2017.

Career

Togo

Becoming manager of 2013 Togolese champions Anges in early 2014, Losciuto targeted a second league title but missed out on the 2014 CAF Champions League, getting knocked out by Nigeria's Enyimba in the second leg despite being them 3–1 in the first leg before being replaced by a Ghanaian that March and becoming their technical director.

Comparing African football to the sport in Europe, the former footballer states that it is much less organized but they have youth training institutes which Europe does not have and has said that the league level in Togo is between the Belgian second and third divisions.

Rwanda

Picked to lead Rayon Sports of the Rwanda National Football League owing to his experience in 2014, the Belgian took Gikundiro to a quarter-final exit to APR at the 2014 Kagame Interclub Cup, going on to say that his squad lacked the potential to contend for silverware ahead of the season. Later, in September, he left the club and claimed it was to resolve family matters in Belgium, when he was actually installed as head coach of ASFA Yennega in Burkina Faso with Rayon Sports on the verge of reporting the incident to FIFA.  Despite originally dismissing it as a rumor, he eventually ended up at ASFA.

Burkina Faso

Concluding a four-year deal with ASFA Yennenga of the Burkinabé Premier League in September 2014, the football director was discharged from his duties in 2015 but claimed that they still owed him money and had to take the case to court.

Nigeria

Assisting Sunday Oliseh at the Nigeria national team in 2015, Losciuto was compared to French tactician Claude Le Roy for his exploits in Africa. However, he had to undergo surgery to remove a small piece of metal from his stomach but became ill shortly after and went to Belgium to get help. Purportedly, the Nigeria Football Federation owed him five months' worth of salaries in 2016 but it is unknown whether it was actually paid or not.

South Africa

Taking over Black Leopards of the South African National First Division in 2016 and arriving on November 11, Losciuto directed Lidoda Duvha from 13th place to the promotion playoffs but was not ostentatious about his achievements. In the end, they did not achieve promotion and he resigned in winter 2017, giving "unbearable working conditions" as his reason coupled with a poor start to the 2017-18 National First Division. Immediately, he was handed the coaching job for Richards Bay of the National First Division but was shown the door by April 2018 with three rounds left of the season.

Egypt
In 2018–2019, Jean-François appointed as assistant coach of Luc Eymale in elgeish Egyptian side.  They led the team in 20 matches and achieved the club objective after won 6 matches and draw in 6 matches and lose in 5 matches.

Equatorial Guinea
In 2019–2020, Jean-François took charge of the Champions of Equatorial Guinea,
Cano Sport.  He led them in to eliminate Mekele FC the Ethiopian champions, then he was eliminated by the giant Al Ahly of Egypt.

References

External links
 Black Leopards demand R2 million for Free State Stars linked Losciuto 
 Rayon Sports captain Fuadi speaks out on Losciuto exit 
 Encadrement technique de l’ASFA-Y : Pourquoi Jean François Losciuto a jeté l’éponge ? 
 Kick Off Tag 
 Jean-Francois Losciuto refuses to concede National First Division title to Thanda Royal Zulu just yet 
 at Footballdatabase.eu

Belgian football managers
Association football defenders
Living people
Expatriate soccer managers in South Africa
Expatriate football managers in Burkina Faso
Belgian footballers
Belgian expatriate football managers
Expatriate football managers in Rwanda
Expatriate football managers in Nigeria
Black Leopards F.C. managers
Belgian expatriate sportspeople in South Africa
Expatriate football managers in Togo
Year of birth missing (living people)
R.C.S. Verviétois managers
Belgian expatriate sportspeople in Rwanda
Belgian expatriate sportspeople in Togo
Belgian expatriate sportspeople in Burkina Faso
Belgian expatriate sportspeople in Nigeria
Futuro Kings FC managers
Belgian expatriates in Equatorial Guinea
Expatriate football managers in Equatorial Guinea